The Calexico Carnegie Library is a Carnegie library located at 420 Heber Ave. in Calexico, Imperial County, California

History
The library was built in 1918 through a $10,000 grant from the Carnegie Foundation; while Calexico had initially requested a $25,000 grant, the Foundation felt that the town's size did not merit the larger amount.

The library was designed in the Spanish Colonial Revival style and features a tile hip roof and a front entrance flanked by pilasters and topped by a scroll. Its original design was more lavish but became simplified due to the Carnegie Foundation's reduced support for the building.

The building served as the city's library until 1986, when a new library building opened. The building was used as a storage facility until it was restored in 2007; it is now a branch of the Calexico City Library and serves as a public technology center.

The Calexico Carnegie Library was added to the National Register of Historic Places on September 28, 2005.

References

External links

Buildings and structures in Imperial County, California
Calexico, California
Library buildings completed in 1918
Libraries on the National Register of Historic Places in California
National Register of Historic Places in Imperial County, California
1918 establishments in California
Spanish Colonial Revival architecture in California